The National Applied Research Laboratories (NARLabs) is  a research institution in Taiwan resulted from the combination of national laboratories into an independent nonprofit institute. It is located in Taipei.

History
NARLabs was established in 2003. In 2019 the National Nano Device Laboratories and National Chip Implementation Center were merged to create the Taiwan Semiconductor Research Institute.

Divisions
 Taiwan Instrument Research Institute
 National Center for High-Performance Computing
 National Center for Research on Earthquake Engineering
 National Laboratory Animal Center
 National Space Organization
 Science and Technology Policy Research and Information Center
 Taiwan Ocean Research Institute
 Taiwan Semiconductor Research Institute

Transportation
NARLabs headquarter office building is accessible within walking distance South West from Technology Building Station of the Taipei Metro.

See also
 National Science and Technology Council (Taiwan)
 Natural Environment Research Council
 Tsinghua Big Five Alliance

References

External links

 

2003 establishments in Taiwan
Research institutes established in 2003
Research institutes in Taiwan